Periscope is the third studio album by the stoner rock/psychedelic rock band Colour Haze, released in 1999. Periscope was re-released in 2005 on the label Elektrohasch, which featured the bonus track "Transmitter" not previously included on the 1999 version.

Track listing 
 "Always Me" – 5:58
 "Antenna" – 9:21
 "Pulse" – 5:07
 "Sun" – 8.43
 "Periscope" – 6:15
 "Periscope (Breit Return)" – 6:20
 "Transmitter" (Bonus track - re-release only) - 12.03

References 

1999 albums
Colour Haze albums